These 153 species belong to Omoglymmius, a genus of wrinkled bark beetles in the family Carabidae.

Omoglymmius species

 Omoglymmius actae R.T. Bell & J.R. Bell, 1982 c g
 Omoglymmius africanus (Grouvelle, 1892) c g
 Omoglymmius alticola (Grouvelle, 1913) c g
 Omoglymmius americanus (Laporte, 1836) i c g b
 Omoglymmius amplus R.T. Bell & J.R. Bell, 1982 c g
 Omoglymmius aristeus R.T. Bell & J.R. Bell, 1989 c g
 Omoglymmius armatus (Arrow, 1901) c g
 Omoglymmius asetatus R.T. Bell & J.R. Bell, 1982 c g
 Omoglymmius astraea R.T. Bell & J.R. Bell, 1987 c g
 Omoglymmius auratus R.T. Bell & J.R. Bell, 1982 c g
 Omoglymmius batantae R.T. Bell & J.R. Bell, 2009 c g
 Omoglymmius batchianus (Arrow, 1901) c g
 Omoglymmius bicarinatus R.T. Bell & J.R. Bell, 1982 c g
 Omoglymmius biroi R.T. Bell & J.R. Bell, 1982 c g
 Omoglymmius bituberculatus R.T. Bell & J.R. Bell, 1992 c g
 Omoglymmius borneensis (Grouvelle, 1903) c g
 Omoglymmius bouchardi R.T. Bell & J.R. Bell, 1982 c g
 Omoglymmius brendelli R.T. Bell & J.R. Bell, 1987 c g
 Omoglymmius bucculatus (Arrow, 1901) c g
 Omoglymmius caelatus R.T. Bell & J.R. Bell, 1981 c g
 Omoglymmius capito (Grouvelle, 1895) c g
 Omoglymmius carinatus (Grouvelle, 1903) c g
 Omoglymmius cavea R.T. Bell & J.R. Bell, 1982 c g
 Omoglymmius cavifrons (Grouvelle, 1914) c g
 Omoglymmius cheesmanae (Arrow, 1942) c g
 Omoglymmius classicus R.T. Bell & J.R. Bell, 1982 c g
 Omoglymmius coelebs R.T. Bell & J.R. Bell, 1982 c g
 Omoglymmius consors R.T. Bell & J.R. Bell, 1982 c g
 Omoglymmius continuus R.T. Bell & J.R. Bell, 1982 c g
 Omoglymmius coomani (Arrow, 1942) c g
 Omoglymmius crassicornis R.T. Bell & J.R. Bell, 1982 c g
 Omoglymmius crassiusculus (Lewis, 1888) c g
 Omoglymmius craticulus R.T. Bell & J.R. Bell, 1985 c g
 Omoglymmius crenatus (Grouvelle, 1903) c g
 Omoglymmius cristatus R.T. Bell & J.R. Bell, 1982 c g
 Omoglymmius cupedoides R.T. Bell & J.R. Bell, 1993 c g
 Omoglymmius cycloderus R.T. Bell & J.R. Bell, 2002 c g
 Omoglymmius darjeelingensis Saha, Halder & Biswas, 1995 c g
 Omoglymmius data R.T. Bell & J.R. Bell, 1982 c g
 Omoglymmius denticulatus R.T. Bell & J.R. Bell, 1982 c g
 Omoglymmius duplex R.T. Bell & J.R. Bell, 1982 c g
 Omoglymmius emdomani R.T. Bell & J.R. Bell, 2000 c g
 Omoglymmius ephemeris R.T. Bell & J.R. Bell, 1982 c g
 Omoglymmius evasus R.T. Bell & J.R. Bell, 1982 c g
 Omoglymmius feae (Grouvelle, 1895) c g
 Omoglymmius ferrugatus R.T. Bell & J.R. Bell, 1987 c g
 Omoglymmius follis R.T. Bell & J.R. Bell, 1982 c g
 Omoglymmius fraudulentus R.T. Bell & J.R. Bell, 1982 c g
 Omoglymmius fringillus R.T. Bell & J.R. Bell, 1982 c g
 Omoglymmius fulgens R.T. Bell & J.R. Bell, 1978 c g
 Omoglymmius germaini (Grouvelle, 1903) c g
 Omoglymmius germari (Ganglbauer, 1891) c g
 Omoglymmius gorgo R.T. Bell & J.R. Bell, 1982 c g
 Omoglymmius gracilicornis (Grouvelle, 1895) c g
 Omoglymmius greensladei R.T. Bell & J.R. Bell, 1978 c g
 Omoglymmius gressitti R.T. Bell & J.R. Bell, 1985 c g
 Omoglymmius gurneyi R.T. Bell & J.R. Bell, 1982 c g
 Omoglymmius hamatus (LeConte, 1875) i c g b
 Omoglymmius hemipunctatus R.T. Bell & J.R. Bell, 1982 c g
 Omoglymmius hesperus R.T. Bell & J.R. Bell, 1982 c g
 Omoglymmius hexagonus (Grouvelle, 1903) c g
 Omoglymmius hiekei R.T. Bell & J.R. Bell, 1982 c g
 Omoglymmius hornabrooki R.T. Bell & J.R. Bell, 1978 c g
 Omoglymmius humeralis (Grouvelle, 1895) c g
 Omoglymmius ichthyocephalus (Lea, 1904) c g
 Omoglymmius impletus R.T. Bell & J.R. Bell, 1981 c g
 Omoglymmius imugani R.T. Bell & J.R. Bell, 1982 c g
 Omoglymmius inaequalis R.T. Bell & J.R. Bell, 1982 c g
 Omoglymmius ineditus (Dajoz, 1975) c g
 Omoglymmius inermis R.T. Bell & J.R. Bell, 1982 c g
 Omoglymmius insularis (Grouvelle, 1903) c g
 Omoglymmius intrusus (Grouvelle, 1903) c g
 Omoglymmius iridescens R.T. Bell & J.R. Bell, 1982 c g
 Omoglymmius javanicus (Grouvelle, 1903) c g
 Omoglymmius krikkeni R.T. Bell & J.R. Bell, 1982 c g
 Omoglymmius largus R.T. Bell & J.R. Bell, 1985 c g
 Omoglymmius laticeps R.T. Bell, 1977 c g
 Omoglymmius lederi (Lewis, 1888) c g
 Omoglymmius lentus R.T. Bell & J.R. Bell, 1982 c g
 Omoglymmius lewisi Nakane, 1978 c g
 Omoglymmius lindrothi R.T. Bell & J.R. Bell, 1982 c g
 Omoglymmius lineatus (Grouvelle, 1908) c g
 Omoglymmius longiceps (Grouvelle, 1910) c g
 Omoglymmius lustrans R.T. Bell & J.R. Bell, 1978 c g
 Omoglymmius malabaricus (Arrow, 1901) c g
 Omoglymmius malaicus (Arrow, 1901) c g
 Omoglymmius manni R.T. Bell & J.R. Bell, 1982 c g
 Omoglymmius massa R.T. Bell & J.R. Bell, 1982 c g
 Omoglymmius microtis R.T. Bell & J.R. Bell, 1982 c g
 Omoglymmius modicus R.T. Bell & J.R. Bell, 1982 c g
 Omoglymmius modiglianii R.T. Bell & J.R. Bell, 1982 c g
 Omoglymmius monteithi R.T. Bell & J.R. Bell, 1992 c g
 Omoglymmius morditus R.T. Bell & J.R. Bell, 1982 c g
 Omoglymmius multicarinatus R.T. Bell & J.R. Bell, 1993 c g
 Omoglymmius mycteroides R.T. Bell & J.R. Bell, 1982 c g
 Omoglymmius nasalis R.T. Bell & J.R. Bell, 1982 c g
 Omoglymmius nemoralis R.T. Bell & J.R. Bell, 1982 c g
 Omoglymmius nicobarensis (Grouvelle, 1895) c g
 Omoglymmius oberthueri (Grouvelle, 1903) c g
 Omoglymmius occultus R.T. Bell & J.R. Bell, 1982 c g
 Omoglymmius oceanicus R.T. Bell & J.R. Bell, 1981 c g
 Omoglymmius offafinus R.T. Bell & J.R. Bell, 1978 c g
 Omoglymmius okei R.T. Bell & J.R. Bell, 1992 c g
 Omoglymmius opacus R.T. Bell & J.R. Bell, 1985 c g
 Omoglymmius opticus R.T. Bell & J.R. Bell, 1982 c g
 Omoglymmius oroensis R.T. Bell & J.R. Bell, 1982 c g
 Omoglymmius patens R.T. Bell & J.R. Bell, 1982 c g
 Omoglymmius peckorum R.T. Bell & J.R. Bell, 1985 c g
 Omoglymmius pectoralis R.T. Bell & J.R. Bell, 1982 c g
 Omoglymmius perplexus R.T. Bell & J.R. Bell, 1985 c g
 Omoglymmius philippinensis (Chevrolat, 1876) c g
 Omoglymmius pilosus (Grouvelle, 1903) c g
 Omoglymmius planiceps R.T. Bell & J.R. Bell, 1982 c g
 Omoglymmius politus R.T. Bell & J.R. Bell, 1982 c g
 Omoglymmius princeps R.T. Bell & J.R. Bell, 1982 c g
 Omoglymmius pulvinatus (Grouvelle, 1903) c g
 Omoglymmius puncticornis R.T. Bell & J.R. Bell, 1982 c g
 Omoglymmius quadraticollis (Arrow, 1901) c g
 Omoglymmius quadruplex R.T. Bell & J.R. Bell, 1982 c g
 Omoglymmius regius R.T. Bell & J.R. Bell, 1982 c g
 Omoglymmius renutus R.T. Bell & J.R. Bell, 1982 c g
 Omoglymmius repetitus R.T. Bell & J.R. Bell, 1982 c g
 Omoglymmius rimatus R.T. Bell & J.R. Bell, 1982 c g
 Omoglymmius rugosus (Grouvelle, 1903) c g
 Omoglymmius rusticus R.T. Bell & J.R. Bell, 1982 c g
 Omoglymmius sabah R.T. Bell & J.R. Bell, 1993 c g
 Omoglymmius sakuraii (Nakane, 1978) c g
 Omoglymmius scopulinus R.T. Bell & J.R. Bell, 1982 c g
 Omoglymmius sectatus R.T. Bell & J.R. Bell, 1982 c g
 Omoglymmius sedlaceki R.T. Bell & J.R. Bell, 1982 c g
 Omoglymmius semioculatus R.T. Bell & J.R. Bell, 1982 c g
 Omoglymmius semperi R.T. Bell & J.R. Bell, 1982 c g
 Omoglymmius seriatus R.T. Bell & J.R. Bell, 1987 c g
 Omoglymmius solitarius (Arrow, 1942) c g
 Omoglymmius strabus (E. Newman, 1838) c g
 Omoglymmius stylatus R.T. Bell & J.R. Bell, 1982 c g
 Omoglymmius subcaviceps (Grouvelle, 1903) c g
 Omoglymmius sulcicollis (Lewis, 1888) c g
 Omoglymmius summissus R.T. Bell & J.R. Bell, 1982 c g
 Omoglymmius sus R.T. Bell & J.R. Bell, 1982 c g
 Omoglymmius tabulatus R.T. Bell & J.R. Bell, 1982 c g
 Omoglymmius thoracicus R.T. Bell & J.R. Bell, 1982 c g
 Omoglymmius tolai R.T. Bell & J.R. Bell, 1985 c g
 Omoglymmius toxopei R.T. Bell & J.R. Bell, 1978 c g
 Omoglymmius trepidus R.T. Bell & J.R. Bell, 1982 c g
 Omoglymmius trisinuatus R.T. Bell & J.R. Bell, 1982 c g
 Omoglymmius truncatus R.T. Bell & J.R. Bell, 2009 c g
 Omoglymmius vadosus R.T. Bell & J.R. Bell, 1982 c g
 Omoglymmius vicinus (Grouvelle, 1895) c g
 Omoglymmius viduus R.T. Bell & J.R. Bell, 1982 c g
 Omoglymmius wallacei R.T. Bell & J.R. Bell, 1987 c g
 Omoglymmius wittmeri R.T. Bell & J.R. Bell, 1982 c g
 Omoglymmius zimmermani R.T. Bell & J.R. Bell, 1978 c g

Data sources: i = ITIS, c = Catalogue of Life, g = GBIF, b = Bugguide.net

References

Omoglymmius